Crossmolina Deel Rovers is a Gaelic Athletic Association club based in Crossmolina, County Mayo, Ireland. The club fields Gaelic football teams in competitions organized by the Mayo GAA county board.

History
Crossmolina Dr Crokes GAA was affiliated with the Mayo GAA county board in 1887. In 1906, the name was changed to Deel Rovers. The name of the ground is called St Tiernan's Park.

Tommy Jordan led the club to the 2000–01 All-Ireland Senior Club Football Championship. Michael Moore and Padraic Syron were selectors and Jarlath Cunningham trained the team.

Achievements
 All-Ireland Senior Club Football Championship Winners 2001  Runners-Up 2003
 Connacht Senior Club Football Championship Winners 1999, 2000, 2002
 Mayo Senior Football Championship Winners 1949, 1995, 1999, 2000, 2002, 2005, 2006   Runners-Up 1948, 1956, 1957, 1963, 1986, 1988, 1998, 2003
 Mayo Junior Football Championship Winners 1926, 1931, 1947, 1955, 1962, 1975, 2006
 Mayo Intermediate Football Championship Winners 1980
 Mayo Under-21 Football Championship Winners 1992, 1997

Notable players and representatives

 Peadár Gardiner

 Conor Loftus

 Mick Loftus

 Seán Lowry

 Ciarán McDonald

 John Maughan
 Michael Moyles

 James Nallen
 John Nallen

 Stephen Rochford

References

External links
 Crossmolina Deel Rovers website

Gaelic games clubs in County Mayo
Gaelic football clubs in County Mayo